Zygomaticus may refer to: 
 Zygomatic bone
 Zygomaticus minor muscle
 Zygomaticus major muscle